NIMA (never in mitosis gene a)-related kinase 1, also known as NEK1, is a human gene highly expressed in germ cells and thought to be involved in meiosis. It is also involved in the response to DNA damage from radiation; defects in this gene can be a cause of polycystic kidney disease. NEK1 is thought to be involved in amytrophic lateral sclerosis.

The gene was discovered by researchers with Project MinE, with the ALS Association providing funding raised through the Ice Bucket Challenge.

See also 
NEK2
NEK3
NEK4

References

Further reading 

 
 
 
 
 
 
 
 
 

Human proteins